This article includes a lists of countries and dependent territories sorted by their real gross domestic product growth rate; the rate of growth of the value of all final goods and services produced within a state in a given year. The statistics were compiled from the International Monetary Fund World Economic Outlook Database with the vast majority of estimates corresponding to the 2021 calendar year. Values from other sources are referenced as such.

This list is not to be confused with the list of countries by real GDP per capita growth, which is the growth rate of GDP per person recalculated according to the changing number of the population of the country.

List (2021)

List (2013–2021) 
 Countries by yearly growth rate 1999–2021. The data is from the International Monetary Fund.

See also 
 Economic growth
 List of European countries by GDP growth
 World economy
 Gross domestic product

References

External links 
 Economic information by country
  Economics focus: Grossly distorted picture From March 13, 2008, The Economist print edition. Sub-title "If you look at GDP per head, the world is a different—and, by and large, a better—place"
 World Map and Chart of GDP Annual Growth % by Lebanese-economy-forum, World Bank data

Real GDP growth rate